Shady Habash (1995–2020) was an Egyptian filmmaker.

Biography
Habash started a photography and video business in 2006. He was imprisoned without trial in March 2018 for making a music video for the exiled Egyptian rock musician Ramy Essam, that mocked Egyptian President Abdel Fattah el-Sisi. The video's release prompted the arrest of eight people, who were accused of "joining a terrorist group" and "spreading false news." As of 3 May 2020, the video had more than five million views on YouTube. After being incarcerated for more than two years in pretrial detention, Habash died in Tora Prison in Cairo in May 2020 at the age of 24. Prosecutors stated that Habash's cause of death was officially ruled as alcohol poisoning in an autopsy, with the prosecutor-general further elaborating that Habash had mistakenly drinken alcohol-based hand sanitizer; according to the prosecutor-general, Habash died before he could be hospitalized.

Legacy
John Greyson's 2021 experimental short documentary film International Dawn Chorus Day was created as a tribute to Habash and Sarah Hegazi.

References

External links

Music video for "Balaha" by Ramy Essam on YouTube

Egyptian film directors
1995 births
Place of birth missing
2020 deaths
Prisoners and detainees of Egypt
Egyptian people who died in prison custody